Schmitz Lake is a natural lake in South Dakota, in the United States.

Schmitz Lake has the name of August Schmitz, a pioneer settler.

See also
List of lakes in South Dakota

References

Lakes of South Dakota
Lakes of Aurora County, South Dakota